The Last Dawn is a 1917 Hungarian film directed by Michael Curtiz.

Cast
 Jenö Balassa as Lord Harding
 Leopold Kramer as Harry Kernett
 Erzsi B. Marton as Princess Halasdane
 Kálmán Ujj as Edward

See also
 Michael Curtiz filmography

External links

Films directed by Michael Curtiz
1917 films
Hungarian black-and-white films
Hungarian silent films
Austro-Hungarian films